Dutch Windmill may refer to:

 Bep van Klaveren, Dutch boxer who was nicknamed The Dutch Windmill
 Fabyan Windmill, windmill in Geneva, Illinois, United States
 List of windmills in the Netherlands
 Speculaas, also known as Dutch Windmill cookies
 Dutch Windmill, one of two Golden Gate Park windmills in San Francisco, California